Joonas Liimatainen (born July 4, 1991) is a Finnish professional ice hockey player who played with the Cardiff Devils in the EIHL during the 2013-14 season.

Liimatainen signed a one-month trial contract with the Devils on November 19, 2013.

References

External links

1991 births
Living people
Finnish ice hockey defencemen
Tappara players
Cardiff Devils players
Ice hockey people from Tampere
Finnish expatriate ice hockey players in Wales
Finnish expatriate ice hockey players in Kazakhstan
Finnish expatriate ice hockey players in Scotland
Finnish expatriate ice hockey players in England
Finnish expatriate ice hockey players in the Netherlands
Dundee Stars players